Union Sportive Melloise was a French association football team founded in 1937 under the name Jeunesse Ouvrière Sportive Melloise. The club changed to its current name in 1943. 

The club was based in Melle, Deux-Sèvres, France and played at the Stade du Pinier.

The club was dissolved in July 2014.

References

External links
US Melle official website 

Melle
1937 establishments in France
2014 disestablishments in France
Association football clubs established in 1937
Association football clubs disestablished in 2014
Sport in Deux-Sèvres
Football clubs in Nouvelle-Aquitaine